Oudong (also romanized as Udong or Odong) is a former town of the post-Angkorian period (1618–1863) situated in present-day Phsar Daek Commune, Ponhea Lueu District, Kandal Province, Cambodia. Located at the foothill of the mountain Phnom Oudong, also known as Phnom Preah Reach Troap, about 35 km northwest of the modern capital Phnom Penh via National Road No. 5, Oudong was a royal residence and Cambodia's capital for almost 250 years until 1866. A monumental royal necropolis of sovereigns of several centuries is scattered on top of the prominent bisected mountain, which runs from the southeast to the northeast.

Etymology

The city's name is derived from the Sanskrit word "", meaning tall, which probably refers to the mountain. As it had gained religious merit and significance it might have undergone extension towards: "great" or "supreme".

History

Oudong was founded by King Srei Soryapor in 1601, after the abandonment of Longvek. Under the reign of King Ang Duong (1841–1850), he constructed canals, terraces, bridges and erected hundreds of pagodas in this region. 

From 1618 until 1866 it was formally called Oudong Meanchey, home to a succession of kings deposed from the former capital of Longvek by the invading Thais. In 1866, it was abandoned by King Norodom, taking his royal court along with him to the current capital, Phnom Penh. 

During the Cambodian Civil War the town was captured by the Khmer Rouge in March 1974, who marched the citizens into the countryside, as well as executing a large number of prisoners. This proved to be a trial-run for the evacuation of Phnom Penh a year later. The Government retook the town in August the same year, but evidence of atrocities was widely discarded by international journalists.

It was extensively damaged by the Khmer Rouge in 1977, along with the other temples, monuments and religious structures there.

Folklore

Henri Mouhot: "Travels in the Central Parts of Indo-China" 1864:

World Heritage Status
This site was originally added to the UNESCO World Heritage Tentative List on 1 September 1992, in the Cultural category. The submission has been renewed on 27 March 2020.

See also
 Post-Angkor period
 History of Cambodia

References

Sources
 "The Rough Guide Southeast Asia" Rough Guides, 2002

External links
 Brief History of Oudong
 Travels in the Central Parts of Indo-China (Siam), Cambodia, and Laos (Vol. 1 of 2)

Towns in Cambodia
Populated places in Kandal province
Archaeological sites in Cambodia
Buddhist temples in Cambodia